The 2000 America East men's basketball tournament was hosted by the Delaware Blue Hens at Bob Carpenter Center. The final was held at Hofstra Arena on the campus of Hofstra University. Hofstra gained its first America East Conference Championships and an automatic berth to the NCAA tournament with its win over Delaware. Hofstra was given the 14th seed in the East Regional of the NCAA Tournament and lost in the first round to Oklahoma State 86–66. Delaware gained a bid to the NIT and lost in the first round to Villanova 72–63.

Bracket and Results

See also
America East Conference

References

America East Conference men's basketball tournament
1999–2000 America East Conference men's basketball season
College basketball tournaments in Delaware
College basketball tournaments in New York (state)